Vladislav Viktorovich Khatazhyonkov (born 2 May 1984) is a Russian former professional football player.

Club career
He played for the main squad of FC Lokomotiv Moscow in the Russian Premier League Cup.

External links
 

1984 births
Footballers from Moscow
Living people
Russian footballers
Association football defenders
FC Lokomotiv Moscow players
FC Khimki players
PFC Spartak Nalchik players
Russian Premier League players
FC Volgar Astrakhan players
FC Tom Tomsk players
FC Sibir Novosibirsk players
FC SKA-Khabarovsk players
FC Vityaz Podolsk players
FC Fakel Voronezh players
Riga FC players
Russian expatriate footballers
Expatriate footballers in Latvia
FC Nosta Novotroitsk players